Werner Peter (born 25 May 1950 in Sandersdorf) is a former football player from East Germany, who won the silver medal with the East Germany national team at the 1980 Summer Olympics in Moscow, Soviet Union.

He played 255 Oberliga matches (66 goals) for Hallescher FC Chemie.

Werner Peter obtained a total number of nine caps for his native country, scoring one goal.

International goals
Scores and results list. East Germany's goal tally first.

References

External links 
 Werner Peter at Weltfussball.de 
 

1950 births
Living people
People from Anhalt-Bitterfeld
German footballers
East German footballers
Footballers from Saxony-Anhalt
Olympic footballers of East Germany
East Germany international footballers
Dresdner SC players
Hallescher FC players
Association football forwards
Footballers at the 1980 Summer Olympics
Olympic silver medalists for East Germany
Olympic medalists in football
Medalists at the 1980 Summer Olympics
Recipients of the Patriotic Order of Merit in bronze
People from Bezirk Halle